The 2004 Kroger St. Jude International and the Cellular South Cup were tennis tournaments played on indoor hard courts at the Racquet Club of Memphis in Memphis, Tennessee in the United States that were part of the International Series Gold of the 2004 ATP Tour and of Tier III of the 2004 WTA Tour. The tournaments ran from February 15 through February 22, 2004.

Finals

Men's singles

 Joachim Johansson defeated  Nicolas Kiefer 7–6(7–5), 6–3
 It was Johansson's only title of the year and the 1st of his career.

Women's singles

 Vera Zvonareva defeated  Lisa Raymond 4–6, 6–4, 7–5
 It was Zvonareva's 1st title of the year and the 2nd of her career.

Men's doubles

 Bob Bryan /  Mike Bryan defeated  Jeff Coetzee /  Chris Haggard 6–3, 6–4
 It was Bob Bryan's 2nd title of the year and the 16th of his career. It was Mike Bryan's 2nd title of the year and the 18th of his career.

Women's doubles

 Åsa Svensson /  Meilen Tu defeated  Maria Sharapova /  Vera Zvonareva 6–4, 7–6(7–0)
 It was Svensson's only title of the year and the 9th of her career. It was Tu's only title of the year and the 5th of her career.

External links
 Official website
 ATP Tournament Profile
 WTA Tournament Profile

 
Kroger St. Jude International
Cellular South Cup
Kroger St. Jude International
Kroger St. Jude International
Kroger St. Jude International